Belaye Vozera is a rural settlement in Brest District of  Brest Region of Belarus, located in the recreational area on the shore of Belaye (White) Lake, 25 km south of Brest, Belarus, 7 km east of the frontier with Poland, and 15 km from the border crossing Damačava-Sławatycze. A big recreational complex “Belaye vozera” was built here in the Soviet period. Chalet “Greenwood” comprising a hotel and a restaurant of European standard was built here in 2013

References

Populated places in Brest Region
Brest District
Grodno Governorate
Polesie Voivodeship